Edmund Scarborough (May 1840 - ?) was a minister, farmer and state legislator in Mississippi. He represented Holmes County, Mississippi in the Mississippi House of Representatives in 1870-1871.

He was born enslaved in Greene County, Alabama in May 1840 and obtained his freedom in 1863. Eric Foner documented him as Edmond Scarborough and another newspaper listed him as Edward Scarborough.

He was married to Martha in 1857 with whom he was listed as living with in Holmes County in both the 1900 and 1910 census.

In 1866 he built, along with his brother-in-law, the first negro Methodist church in the county.

He served in the Mississippi House with William B. Williams and Cicero Mitchell from Holmes County.
At the 1875 Holmes County Republican Convention he was assigned the position of Cotton Weigher.

After his service to the legislature he was a Deacon Elder of his church in which position he was reported to have baptised 500 people.

He died sometime after 1912 at which point he was recorded as owning multiple urban lots and other property.

See also
 African-American officeholders during and following the Reconstruction era

References

Republican Party members of the Mississippi House of Representatives
People from Greene County, Alabama
People from Holmes County, Mississippi
1840 births
Year of death missing
African-American politicians during the Reconstruction Era
African-American state legislators in Alabama
American freedmen
African Methodist Episcopal Church clergy
19th-century American Methodist ministers
Methodists from Mississippi